The Punch is a Nigerian daily newspaper founded On August 8, 1970. Punch Nigeria Limited was registered under the Companies Act of 1968 to engage in the business of publishing newspapers, magazines and other periodicals. It was designed to inform, educate and entertain Nigerians and the world at large.

History
The Punch was founded by James Aboderin, an accountant, and Sam Amuka, a columnist and editor at the Daily Times of Nigeria. Amuka became the first editor of the Sunday Punch. In November 1976, a few years after the first print of its Sunday edition, the duo started printing their trademark daily newspaper. Both editions were designed to favor a friendlier apolitical approach to news reporting, combining footage of social events with everyday political news. The paper sustains itself by delving into broad issues that interest myriad people.

However, during the twilight of the Second Republic, political exigencies had introduced conflicts to its original intentions. Aboderin and Amuka parted ways due partly to political conflicts. Aboderin later secured the support of his former foe, M. K. O. Abiola, after the latter left the NPN. The paper began to take on a political stance, mostly against the Shagari regime. Supposedly, days before the end of the administration of Shagari, a few Punch editors were aware of a coup approaching and injected strong anti-government tones in their reporting.

Press freedom
The Punch was not immune to the excess of authoritarian regimes in the country. In 1990, its editor was jailed for 54 days. In 1993 and 1994, the publishing house was closed on the direction of the nation's ruler.

The company
Punch Nigeria Limited was registered on August 8, 1970, under the Companies Act of 1968 to engage in the business of publishing newspapers, magazines and other periodicals of public interest. It was designed to perform the tripartite functions of the popular mass media: informing, educating and entertaining Nigerians and the world at large. The company has a board of directors, which is the highest policy-making organ of the company. 

In 1971, the company made its debut with the publication of HAPPY HOME, a family-oriented magazine. Its first editor was Bunmi Sofola. On Sunday, March 18, 1973, its first weekly newspaper, Sunday PUNCH, hit the newsstands. Edited by Ajibade Fashina-Thomas.

The Punch, a daily tabloid followed on November 1, 1976. Its pioneer editor was Dayo Wright. However, by the 1980s, the two tabloid had been repackaged.

On April 29, 1990, a week after an attempted coup d'état against the Federal Military Government, the company was closed down. The closure lasted a month while the then Deputy Editor of The Punch, Chris Mammah, was detained for 54 days. Again in July 1993, The Federal Military Government shut the company's premises, vide Decree No 48 of 1993, and banned all its publications from circulating in the country. The closure followed the political crisis caused by annulment of June 12, 1993, Presidential election.

On November 17 of the same year, the proscription order was repealed vide the Decree No 115 of 1993. The Federal Military Government struck on the July 24, 1994, and proscribed all the titles including TOPLIFE, which had been revived and published as a weekly magazine then. The then editor of THE PUNCH, Bola Bolawole, was detained for three days in his office in the old building. During the closure, the government ignored a court order that it should vacate the premises of the company and also pay the sum of N25 million and N100,000.00 respectively to the company and Bolawole. It was not until October 1, 1995 that government de-proscribed the publication via a national day broadcast by the Head of State.

Most widely read newspaper
From 1998 to 1999, the research and marketing services (RMS) Lagos, published independent surveys in which The Punch was rated as the most widely read newspaper.

PUNCH press: Goss Community
Introduced in 1963, the Goss community began life as a single unit sitting on top of a reel stand. At that time it had a maximum speed of 12,000cph and a cut-off 22.75ins or 578mm. In recent years, enhancement made to the Community included speed and functionality upgrades and the addition of high specification model called magnum. Today, the Community offers a range of cut-offs (546-630mm): four-high configurations; web widths up to 1,000mm and a range of jaw and rotary folder options.

PUNCH's Goss Community was delivered in November 1998. It is capable of producing 30,000(cphs).

The PUNCH press, which has expandable color units, is capable of printing eight pages of full color and eight of spot color at up to 48 pages, and it is more often used in the western part of Nigeria.

References

Bibliography 

Ayo Olutokun and Dele Seteolu, "The Media and Democratic Rule in Nigeria", Development Policy Management Network Bulletin, Vol. XIII, N° 3, September 2001.
Adigun Agbaje, "Freedom of the Press and Party Politics in Nigeria: Precepts, Retrospect and Prospects", African Affairs, Vol. 89, No. 355, April 1990.

Daily newspapers published in Nigeria
1971 establishments in Nigeria
Newspapers established in 1971